Holy Smoke may refer to:

Film, TV and media
Holy Smoke!, a film directed by Jane Campion, with Kate Winslet and Harvey Keitel
Damian Thompson's conservative Catholic blog for The Daily Telegraph

Music
Holy Smoke!, comedy album by Richard Pryor 1976
Holy Smoke (Gin Wigmore album)
Holy Smoke (Peter Murphy album)
"Holy Smoke" (song), a song by Iron Maiden